Slzy a úsmevy, Op.25  (Tears and Smiles) is a 1909 song cycle on Slovak poetry by Slovak composer Mikuláš Schneider-Trnavský. It is among his best known vocal compositions. The songs were first published in 1912.

Songs
1. Prsteň ("A ring") to a text by Janko Jesenský
2. Pieseň ("A song") Ivan Krasko
3. Vesper Dominicae - Ivan Krasko
4. Letí Havran, Letí ("Fly crow, fly") Svetozár Hurban Vajanský
5. Nôžka ("The little leg") Svetozár Hurban Vajanský
6. Uspávanka ("Lullaby") from the publication Nový Nápev Na Prostonárodné Slová
7. Keď Na Deň Zvoniť Mali ("When in the morning rings the bell") Ivan Krasko
8. Magdaléna - Vladimír Roy

Recordings
 Štefan Margita, 2006

References

Slovak songs
Slovak-language songs
1909 songs